Horace B. Carpenter (January 31, 1875 – May 21, 1945) was an American actor, film director, and screenwriter. He appeared in more than 330 films between 1914 and 1946. He also directed 15 films between 1925 and 1934. Born in Grand Rapids, Michigan, Carpenter died in Hollywood, California, from a heart attack.

Selected filmography

Actor

 The Man on the Box (1914)
 The Call of the North (1914)
 The Virginian (1914)
 The Man from Home (1914)
 The Ghost Breaker (1914)
 The Goose Girl (1915)
 The Arab (1915)
 Carmen (1915)
 The Unknown (1915)
 The Golden Chance (1915)
 The Plow Girl (1916)
 The Sowers (1916)
 Maria Rosa (1916)
 Sweet Kitty Bellairs (1916)
 The Clown (1916)
 Common Ground (1916)
 The Heir to the Hoorah (1916)
 Joan the Woman (1916)
 Castles for Two (1917)
 Nan of Music Mountain (1917)
 The Devil-Stone (1917)
 Terror of the Range (1919)
 The Silent Stranger (1924)
 Vultures of the Sea (1928)
 Texas Tommy (1928)
 Bride of the Desert (1929)
 False Fathers (1929)
 West of the Rockies  (1929)
 Trails of the Golden West (1931)
 Pueblo Terror (1931)
 Riders of the Rio (1931)
 Partners of the Trail (1931)
 Out of Singapore (1932)
 Riders of the Desert (1932)
 Outlaw Justice (1932)
 The Seventh Commandment (1932)
 Mark of the Spur (1932)
 Breed of the Border (1933)
 The Pecos Dandy (1934)
 Maniac (1934)
 Smokey Smith (1935)
 Where Trails End (1942)

Director
 Flashing Steeds (1925)
 Desperate Odds (1925)
 The Sagebrush Lady (1925)
 Fangs of Fate (1925)
 The Last Chance (1926)
 The Lovin' Fool (1926)
 Jus' Travlin (1927)
 False Fathers (1929)
 West of the Rockies  (1929)
 The Pecos Dandy (1934)

Writer
 Wild and Woolly (Story, 1917)
 Fangs of Fate (1925)
 The Last Chance (1926)
 Bullets and Justice (Scenario, 1929)
 The Arizona Kid (Scenario, 1929)
 Fighters of the Saddle (Scenario, 1929)

References

External links

1875 births
1945 deaths
American male film actors
American male silent film actors
American male screenwriters
Silent film directors
Male actors from Grand Rapids, Michigan
Film directors from Michigan
Burials at Hollywood Forever Cemetery
Screenwriters from Michigan
Silent film screenwriters
20th-century American male actors
20th-century American male writers
20th-century American screenwriters
Male Western (genre) film actors